Banksia pallida is a species of column-shaped shrub that is endemic to the south-west of Western Australia. It has densely hairy stems, linear leaves with three to five serrations on each side, pale yellow flowers in heads of up to eighty and egg-shaped to elliptical follicles.

Description

Taxonomy and naming
This species was first formally described in 1996 by Alex George who gave it the name Dryandra pallida and published the description in the journal Nuytsia from specimens he collected near Pingaring in 1969. The specific epithet (pallida) is from the Latin word pallidus meaning "pale", referring to the colour of the flowers.

In 2007, Austin Mast and Kevin Thiele transferred all the dryandras to the genus Banksia and this species became Banksia pallida.

Distribution and habitat
Banksia pallida grows in kwongan and is found between Nyabing, Frank Hann National Park, Kulin and Holt Rock in the Esperance Plains and Mallee biogeographic regions.

Conservation status
This banksia is classed as "not threatened" by the Western Australian Government Department of Parks and Wildlife.

References

pallida
Plants described in 1996
Taxa named by Alex George